The A51 autoroute is a partly completed motorway in southeast France. It is the long-term project to connect Marseille to Grenoble via Aix-en-Provence, the Durance Valley and the Hautes-Alpes department.

Route

The motorway passes the cities of Aix-en-Provence, Pertuis, Manosque, Sisteron and then Digne-les-Bains and Tallard. In the Isère department, it passes Monestier-de-Clermont, Vif and Varces-Allières-et-Risset. The motorway provides access to the southwestern Alps for the residents of the South of France.

Its main section connects Marseille to Aix-en-Provence and the Durance Valley to the north of Sisteron (Saulce). Only 18 km is toll free between Marseilles and Aix-en-Provence, the remaining 128 km is a toll road operated by Escota between Aix-en-Provence and Saulce.   At Aix-en-Provence, the autoroute becomes briefly the N296 dual-carriageway between the exits Jas-de-Boufan and Aix-les-Platanes.  This section where it meets the N7 was originally proposed to be an autoroute but building has subsequently compromised the route.  There is a speed limit of 50 km/h on part of the N296.

A section at the Grenoble end, Varces to Coynelle (17 km), was opened in July 1999. This was extended in March 2007 when the next section, connecting Coynelle to the Col du Fau (10.5 km), was opened in March 2007. This includes 4.5 km which is a single carriageway through the Tunnel of Sinard and over the Viaduct de Monestier.  This northern section is also a toll road but it is operated by AREA. This has greatly reduced the summer congestion through the commune of Monestier.

Southern section
00 Exchange A7-A51 Junction with A7 to Marseille-Lyon
01 km 2 (Plan de Campagne) Towns served:  Les Payrets
02 km 5 Exchange A51-A515 Junction with A515 spur to Gardanne
Service Area: Les Chabauds/La Champouse
03 km 9 (Luynes-ZI des Milles) Towns served: Luynes
04 km 10 (Bouc-Bel-Air) Towns served: Bouc-Bel-Air
04a km 11 (Luynes-Gardanne) Towns served: Gardanne, Luynes
05 km 14 (Les Milles) Towns served: Les Milles
05a km 16 (Aix- Centre) Towns served: Aix
 Exchange A51-A8 Junction with A8 to Orange-Nice.
06 km 19  (Aix-en-Provence) Towns served: Aix autoroute becomes the RN296a.
Exchange RN296-A51 Autoroute recommences after a junction with the RN296.
11 (Aix-Les Platanes-Sud) Towns served: Aix
12 km 1 (Les Platanes) Towns served: Aix
13 km 3 (Venelles) Towns served: Venelles
14 km 5  (Meyrargues) Towns served: Meyrargues
Service Area: Meyrargues/Meyrargues-Fontbelle
 Péage de Pertuis
Rest Area km 24 Pont Mirabeau
Rest Area: km 28 Jouques
17 km 32 (Saint-Paul-les-Durance) Towns served: Gréoux-les-Bains
18 km 46 (Manosque) Towns served: Manosque
Service Area: Manosque-(Est)/Volx-(Ouest)
19 km 60 (La Brillanne) Towns served: Forcalquier via RN100
Rest Area: Ganagobie
20 km 75 (Peyruis) Towns served: Peyruis, Les Mées
Rest Area: Belvédère de Peyruis/Les Mées
21 km 85.5 (Aubignosc) Towns served:  Aubignosc, RN85
Rest Area km 87 Aubignosc
22 km 91 (Sisteron-sud) Towns served: Sisteron
23 km 98 (Sisteron Nord) Towns served: Sisteron
 km 114 Péage de La Saulce-Tallard
24 km 114 (La Saulce-Tallard) Temporary end of the autoroute which joins the RN85 to Grenoble.

Northern Section
The autoroute recommences 85 km to the north west.      
 (Col du Fau-N75) Autoroute recommences with junction on the RN75 Sisteron to Grenoble.
13 (Sinard) Towns served: Sinard, Monestier-de-Clermont
Rest Area Les Marceaux/Les Jaillets
Péage du Crozet
12 (Vif) Towns served: Vif
11 (St-Paul de Varces) Towns served:  St-Paul de Varces, Le Gua
10 (Varces) Towns served: Varces
 Exchange A51-A480 Junction with the A480 to Grenoble, Chambéry and Lyon.

History 
The first section was built in 1953, it connected the Autoroute de nord (open in 1951) to Cabriès. It was only extended to Aix-en-Provence and the A8 in 1970. The construction of the section from Grenoble to Sisteron was subject to protests because of its environmental impact. In 1995 for example, demonstrators blocked work by chaining themselves to construction equipment.

Future
Following many ministerial and policy changes, and tensions between local residents.  As a result, the completion of the motorway has been on the agenda for 20 years.

Were all the sections are completed the road journey from Grenoble-Marseille would be 2h40 (instead of the current 3h30). However, there are several problems:

The design of the road
The class of roads (toll/free autoroute, expressway or upgrade of the current roads (N75 and N85)
The cost of the project.
Strong environmental impact of the route.

The motorway must pass through the middle of the South-Dauphiné (Trièves) Alps. There were two options for the route between the Col de Fau (Monestier-de-Clermont) and the end of the southern section near Gap:

 The "High Route" was the most direct route over several high passes to Sisteron (The budget at the time was envisaged at 1.8 billion euros)
 "Gap East" (via the Drac valley, the Col de Bayard and the Avance valley) to Saulce the current end of the motorway from Marseille (the budget was envisaged to be approximately 2.2 billion euros).

Following a public inquiry organized between 2005 and 2006, the Minister Mr Perben announced in 2006 that A51 would be built on the Gap East route. However the 2011 edition of the National Scheme of Transport Infrastructure (SNIT) did not include the completion of this section. Completion before 2025 is unlikely.

External links

 A51 Motorway in Saratlas
 Unofficial website of the A51 Motorway

A51